Scopula rufolutaria is a moth of the  family Geometridae. It is found in the Comoro Islands (Mayotte, Anjouan and Grande Comore) and Madagascar.

References

rufolutaria
Moths of Madagascar
Moths of the Comoros
Moths described in 1900